No Ghost in the Morgue is a Canadian short comedy-drama film, directed by Marilyn Cooke and released in 2022. The film stars Schelby Jean-Baptiste as Keity, a medical student who takes an internship working in the morgue after failing to get her desired surgery placement, and repeatedly sees the ghost of her dead grandmother Myriam (Mireille Metellus).

The cast also includes Michel Laperrière, Ariane Bérubé	and Alexandra Laferrière.

The film premiered in March 2022 at the Santa Barbara International Film Festival, and had its Canadian premiere at the 2022 Toronto International Film Festival.

The film was named to TIFF's annual year-end Canada's Top Ten list for 2022, and was a Canadian Screen Award nominee for Best Live Action Short Drama at the 11th Canadian Screen Awards in 2023.

References

External links

2022 films
2022 short films
2022 comedy-drama films
Canadian comedy short films
Canadian drama short films
Black Canadian films
2020s English-language films
2020s Canadian films